David J.A. Jenkins is a British-born University Professor in the department of Nutritional Sciences at the University of Toronto, Canada.

Jenkins is credited with developing the concept of the glycemic index as a way of explaining the way in which dietary carbohydrate impacts blood sugar. His first paper on the subject appeared in the American Journal of Clinical Nutrition in 1981. Jenkins went on to author at least 15 more clinical studies on the effects of the glycemic index.

More recently his focus has shifted to optimising serum lipids rather than glycemic index, culminating in a diet he calls the Portfolio Diet that prioritises whole plant foods high in protein, healthy fats & soluble (viscous) fibre. His present interests are in running clinically based dietary trials to elucidate the potential of diet to prevent and treat chronic diseases such as heart disease, cancer and diabetes.

References

Academic staff of the University of Toronto
Canadian nutritionists
Living people
Year of birth missing (living people)